Pas på svinget i Solby is a 1940 Danish family film directed by Lau Lauritzen Jr. and Alice O'Fredericks.

Cast
Ludvig Brandstrup as Hauge
Berthe Qvistgaard as Marianne Hauge
Sigfred Johansen as Pastor Holger Lind
Maria Garland as Tante Marie
Jon Iversen as Biskoppen
Ingeborg Pehrson as Fru Augusta Larsen
Sigurd Langberg as Larsen
Thorkil Lauritzen as Tjener Christensen
Else Jarlbak as Biskoppens kone
Ib Schønberg as Doktor Gustav Berg
Helge Kjærulff-Schmidt as Automobilforhandler
Connie Meiling as Anna Pedersen
Tove Arni as Mariannes Veninde
Henry Nielsen - Svendsen
Astrid Villaume as Ung pige ved bal
Knud Heglund as Købmand Sigvaldsen

External links

1940 films
1940 drama films
1940s Danish-language films
Danish black-and-white films
Films directed by Lau Lauritzen Jr.
Films directed by Alice O'Fredericks
Danish drama films